William John Owens (November 14, 1901 – May 5, 1999) was an American baseball shortstop in the Negro leagues. He played from 1923 to 1933 with several teams.

References

External links
 and Baseball-Reference Black Baseball stats and Seamheads
Obituary

1901 births
1999 deaths
Birmingham Black Barons players
Indianapolis ABCs players
Indianapolis ABCs (1931–1933) players
Cleveland Tigers (baseball) players
Detroit Stars players
Kansas City Monarchs players
Dayton Marcos players
Washington Potomacs players
20th-century African-American sportspeople
Baseball infielders